Rajiv Gandhi University (RGU) (formerly Arunachal University) is the oldest university in the Indian state of Arunachal Pradesh. It is located at Rono Hills in Doimukh town, about nine miles from the state capital, Itanagar. The foundation stone for the university was laid in 1984 by then-Prime Minister Indira Gandhi. The university was renamed as Rajiv Gandhi University in 2005 when UPA Chairperson Sonia Gandhi was on a visit to the state.

Status 
Rajiv Gandhi University has been a Central University under the Ministry of Human Resource Development (MHRD), Government of India since 9 April 2007. It is an accredited university under the University Grants Commission.

Organisation and Administration

Faculty 

 Faculty of Agricultural ScienceDepartment of Agriculture
Department of Food Technology
Department of Agronomy
Department of Agricultural Economics
Department of Agricultural Entomology

 Faculty of Commerce and Management Studies

Department of Commerce
Department of Management

 Faculty of Education
Department of Education
Department of Psychology

 Faculty of Languages

Department of English
Department of Hindi

 Faculty of Physical education and Sport Science
Department of Physical Education
Department of Sports Biomechanics
Department of Sports Physiology
Department of Sports Psychology
Department of Strength Training and Conditioning

 Faculty of Social Science

Department of Anthropology
Department of Economics
Department of History
Department of Political Science
Department of Sociology
Department of Social Work
Department of Fine Arts and Music
Department of  National Security Studies

 Faculty of Basic Science

Department of Mathematics
Department of Physics
Department of Chemistry

 Faculty of Environmental Science

Department of Geography
Department of Geology

 Faculty of Life Science

Department of Botany
Department of Zoology

 Faculty of Engineering & Technology
Department of Computer Science and Engineering
Department of Electronics and Communication Engineering

 Faculty of Information Technology
Department of Mass Communications

Institute and Centers

 Arunachal Institute of Tribal Studies
 Institute of Distance Education
 Center with Potential for Excellence in Biodiversity
 Computer & Information Center
 Centre for Women Studies
 Bio-informatics centre
 Centre for youth development and leadership Studies
 Centre for Development studies 
 physical education centre

Ranking 

Rajiv Gandhi University was ranked in the 101-150 band in the University category by the National Institutional Ranking Framework (NIRF) of 2021.

Affiliated colleges 
, the university has 36 affiliated colleges.  Colleges in Arunachal Pradesh were previously affiliated to North Eastern Hill University. Notable colleges include:

 Jawaharlal Nehru College, Pasighat
 Dera Natung Government College, Itanagar

Student life

Festivals 
Arunachal Panorama–the Festival of Diversity
Uni-Fest
V.C Trophy
Inter-college Youth Festival.

References

External links

 
Universities in Arunachal Pradesh
Education in Itanagar
Central universities in India
1984 establishments in Arunachal Pradesh
Educational institutions established in 1984